King's Seat Hill is a hill in the Ochil Hills range, part of the Central Lowlands in Scotland. A popular hill, paths originate from the foothill towns of Tillicoultry and Dollar to the southwest and southeast respectively, but the hill is also climbed as part of a cross-range walk. The location of the exact summit is difficult to find due to the flatness of the summit area, however a large tourist cairn is found to the south.

References

Mountains and hills of Clackmannanshire
Donald mountains